Košarkaški klub Kakanj, commonly referred to as KK Kakanj, is a men's professional basketball club based in Kakanj, Zenica-Doboj Canton, Bosnia and Herzegovina. They are currently competing in the Bosnia and Herzegovina Championship.

History
The club won the 2nd-tier A1 League in the 2011–12 season and got promoted to Bosnia and Herzegovina Championship for the 2012–13 season.

Home arena
Kakanj plays its home games at the KSC Kakanj Sports Hall. The hall is located in Kakanj, Zenica-Doboj Canton, and was built in 1985. It has a seating capacity of 1,300 seats.

Players

Head coaches 

  Jakub Genjac (2011–2012)
  Radomir Kisić (2013)
  Josip Pandža (2013–2018)
  Benjamin Šabić (2018–present)

Trophies and awards
Bosnian A1 League (2nd-tier)
Winners (2): 2009–10, 2011–12
 Mirza Delibašić Memorial
Winners (1): 2018

See also 
 OK Kakanj (volleyball club)

References

External links
 Profile at eurobasket.com
 Profile at realgm.com

Kakanj
Kakanj
Kakanj
Kakanj
Sport in Kakanj